Aleksandr Fukin (born 26 March 1985) is a Russian futsal player who plays for KPRF and the Russian national futsal team.

Biography
Fukin is a graduate of Dina Moscow. He made his debut for first team in 2001/02, when he scored his first goal and became one of the youngest player scored goal in the history of Russian futsal. In 2003/04 he helped Dina to win silver medals and was honored he best young player of Russian championship.

Fukin was a member of Russian national team on European Futsal Championships in 2005 and 2007, where Russian side won silver and bronze medals. In 2007, he scored goal in the match for the third place against Portugal.

In 2005/06 and 2006/07 he was among top-10 goalscorers of Russian championship but silver medals-2003/04 was the only success with Dina – club’s result were quite poor that time.

In 2008/09 he moved to Dinamo Moscow. That year he won his first trophy – Russian Cup, scored goal in final against VIZ-Sinara (Ekaterinburg). With Dinamo he won three titles of Russian champion – (2010/11, 2011/12, 2012/13).

Achievements

Club
Russian champion (3): 2010/11, 2011/12, 2012/13

Russian Cup winner (4): 2009, 2010, 2011, 2013

UEFA Futsal Cup runner-up: 2011/12, 2012/13

International
European Futsal Championship silver medalist: 2005, 2012, 2014

European Futsal Championship bronze medalist: 2007

Futsal World Championship semi-final: 2008

References

External links
UEFA profile
AMFR profile

1985 births
Living people
Russian men's futsal players